The 2019 Breeders' Cup Classic was the 36th running of the Breeders' Cup Classic, part of the 2019 Breeders' Cup World Thoroughbred Championships program. It was run on November 2, 2019 at Santa Anita Park in Arcadia, California with a purse of $6,000,000. The race was won by Vino Rosso.

The Classic is run on dirt at one mile and one-quarter (approximately 2000 m). It is run under weight-for-age conditions, with entrants carrying the following weights:
Northern Hemisphere three-year-olds: 122 lb
Southern Hemisphere three-year-olds: 117 lb
Four-year-olds and up: 126 lb
Any fillies or mares receive a 3 lb allowance

The race was broadcast on NBC with a post time of 5:44 PM Pacific Daylight Time (PDT) – prime time on the East Coast.

Contenders
Pre-entries for the 2019 Classic were announced on October 21 with the post position draw held on October 28.

The 2019 Classic was considered to be wide open, given that the major races in the division for both three-year-olds and older male horses were split between many contenders. The favorite was McKinzie, a 4-year-old colt who had finished either first or second in all of his starts in 2019, including a win in the Whitney Handicap. The top-ranked three-year-old in the race was Code of Honor, who had won the Travers Stakes and Jockey Club Gold Cup, the latter by disqualification. The mare Elate attempted to become just the second female horse to win the race, the other being Zenyatta in 2009.

The other entries were:
 Vino Rosso – won the Gold Cup at Santa Anita. disqualified to second in the Jockey Club Gold Cup
 Higher Power – won the Pacific Classic
 Yoshida – second in the Whitney, third in the Woodward
 Mongolian Groom – winner of the Awesome Again, defeating McKinzie
 Owendale – winner of the Ohio and Oklahoma Derbies, third in the Preakness Stakes
 Seeking the Soul – winner of the Stephen Foster
 War of Will – 2019 Preakness Stakes winner
 Math Wizard – winner of the Pennsylvania Derby

Race description
War of Will went to the early lead and set moderate fractions, pressed by Mongolian Groom and McKinzie, who had to check strides a few times along the rail. Vino Rosso was a few lengths further back in fourth, then began his move on the far turn while racing three wide. McKinzie had also started his drive, moving to the lead at the head of the stretch. Vino Rosso gradually closed the gap to McKinzie, then pulled away in the final sixteenth of a mile to win by  lengths.

It was the first Breeders' Cup Classic win for all of Vino Rosso's connections: co-owners Mike Repole (Repole Stable) and Vince Viola (St Elias Stable), trainer Todd Pletcher and jockey Irad Ortiz Jr.

Pletcher felt that the colt's earlier win in the Gold Cup at Santa Anita, run over the same course and distance, was pivotal to his success in the Classic. "It gave us confidence that the horse handled the track", he said. "We had a blueprint in place that worked. So we tried to follow that pattern exactly, and we did."

Joel Rosario, who rode McKinzie, felt his horse simply got tired. "I let him run a little bit on the backside just to get my spot", he said. "That might have cost him a little bit. He ran his heart out, so we can't be too disappointed. We were just beaten by the best horse on the day."

Mongolian Groom suffered a severe injury to his left hind leg during the stretch run and was later euthanized. Santa Anita had instigated a number of changes to enhance equine safety after a troubling number of deaths during its winter/spring meeting. "It's something we were all very concerned about coming in", said Pletcher. "I think everyone took every possible precautionary measure."

Results  

Times:  – 23.09;   – 47.16;  – 1:10.71; mile – 1:36.35;  final – 2:02.80.
Splits for each quarter-mile: (23.09) (24.07) (23.55) (25.64) (26.45)

Source: Equibase Chart

Payout
Payout Schedule:

 $1 Exacta (10-8) Paid $23.80 
 $1 Trifecta (10-8-7) Paid $197.00 
 $1 Superfecta (10-8-7-6) Paid $1,213.00

References

Breeders' Cup
Breeders' Cup Classic
Breeders' Cup Classic
Breeders' Cup Classic